Noi the Albino ( is an Icelandic film by director Dagur Kári released in 2003. The film explores the life of teenage outsider Nói (played by Tómas Lemarquis) in a remote fishing village in western Iceland. It won multiple awards.

Nói albinói was filmed in Bolungarvik (pop. 957), a fishing village in the far northwest of Iceland, located on the Westfjords peninsula.

The moody original musical score is from the director's band, Slowblow.

The Los Angeles Times' Kenneth Turan called the movie "singular enough to have swept the Eddas, the Icelandic Academy Awards" and noted that it was a selection in "dozens of film festivals." Skye Sherwin of the BBC called it "a coming-of-age tale, bound between grinding humdrum and exquisite surrealism."

Plot 

Nói Kristmundsson is a 17-year-old living in a small unnamed remote fishing village in western Iceland with his grandmother Lína (Anna Friðriksdóttir). His father Kiddi (Þröstur Leó Gunnarsson), an alcoholic taxi driver, also lives in town, but Nói appears to have a distant relationship with him. As an alopecia totalis his appearance is strikingly different from others in the village. Much of his time is spent either wandering the desolate town, at the town bookstore, or in a hidden cellar at his grandmother's house, which serves as his private sanctuary. The town is a sort of purgatory for Nói, surrounded by mountains and attainable only by boat during the winter, when the roads through the mountain passes are snowed over. There are signs that Nói is highly intelligent, but he is totally uninterested in school and seems to have an adversarial relationship with the faculty, particularly his math teacher. More often than not he cuts class to go to the local gas station, where he frequently breaks into the slot machine and rigs it for an assured jackpot. The bleak town seem to offer few prospects for the future, and Nói doesn't seem to fit in there.

Things begin to change for Nói when he encounters the new gas station attendant, an attractive young woman who is new to the village. He asks about the new girl to Óskar (Hjalti Rögnvaldsson) the bookstore owner, who informs him that she is his daughter Íris (Elín Hansdóttir), up from the south to escape the city, and to stay away from her. Nói instead begins a tentative romance with Íris. One night they break into the local natural history museum, and are almost caught by a nightwatchman. They hide in a storage closet, where they discover a light-up map of the world. Nói comments that Iceland looks like a spitwad on the map, and Íris suggests that they run away together. Nói asks where, and Íris suggests he press a button on the map and the Hawaiian Islands light up. This is when Nói begins to dream of leaving the village and Iceland altogether. He receives a View-Master as an 18th birthday present from his grandmother, which comes with slide disc of tropical island images. He is particularly transfixed with an image of a tropical beach, the total opposite of his immediate surroundings.

One day at school, he is asked by the principal to meet with a specialist. The specialist asks him a series of questions, including "How many times a day do you masturbate?" Nόi responds by asking the specialist the same question, simultaneously solving a Rubik's Cube. The specialist becomes embarrassed, states that he is the one asking the questions, and gives him an IQ test to complete. Later, Nói uses a tape recorder to take his place in math class, which enrages the teacher. The teacher goes to the principal, insisting that Nόi is a disruptive influence and must be expelled immediately. The principal is hesitant, but he is forced to expel Nόi after the teacher gives the ultimatum that either Nόi goes or he will resign. Nόi angrily leaves the school, knowing that his father will be upset with him. He tells him, and a small altercation between them results. Afterwards his father takes him out to a local bar, where he is kicked out for smuggling liquor and underage drinking. He goes to Óskar's house in search of ĺris, climbing up onto the roof, where he is discovered by Óskar. Óskar tells him he's sent her back, at which point Íris comes down the stairs. Íris insists that Nói stay the night, over Óskar's objections.

His grandmother goes to a local fortune teller, Gylfi (Kjartan Bjargmundsson), and requests that he give Nói a fortune reading, to maybe give him some direction. Nói is working as a grave digger at this time, and goes to see Gylfi on a lunch break. After reading the tea leaves, Gylfi becomes visibly upset, informing Nói that his future is filled with death. Nói, thinking that Gylfi is teasing him, calls him a moron and leaves.  Soon after, Nói leaves his job, getting his grandmother's shotgun.  He attempts to rob a bank, but is thwarted when the bank teller doesn't take him seriously and has the gun taken out of his hands by the bank manager, who angrily pushes him out onto the street. He comes back inside the bank thoroughly humiliated and withdraws all of the money in his account, using it to buy a nice suit. He then steals a car, intending to run away with Íris. She is confused by his arrival and instead looks blankly at him. He realizes that she is not coming with him, and leaves. His car becomes stuck in the snow, and he is quickly apprehended by the police. His father bails him out of jail and takes him home. On the way back they stop at the gas station, where Íris is pumping gas. The father comments that she seems to have gained weight, a ploy he has taught to Nói as a sure way to get women to sleep with you. Nói shrinks down in his seat, embarrassed.

Nói arrives home and descends into his cellar sanctuary. Suddenly, the earth shudders violently, and the light goes out. Nói finds his lighter and tries to escape out of the cellar, but is unable to open the overhead door, and lies down on the floor, watching his lighter until the fuel runs out. He is eventually awoken by the door above him being ripped open. He discovers that there was an avalanche, which has destroyed the house and killed his grandmother and father. At a rescue shelter, he watches the news report and discovers that nearly everyone he knows has been killed in the avalanche, including Íris. Gylfi, his prophecy fulfilled, has also perished. He later returns to the rubble of his grandmother's house to retrieve the View-Master. The movie ends with Nói looking at the tropical beach scene slide as it slowly becomes a vision of a real tropical beach.

DVD details 

MPAA: Rated PG-13 for language and brief nudity.

Runtime: France: 82 min; Iceland: 93 min; Netherlands (Rotterdam Film Festival): 90 min; Netherlands: 95 min; Sweden: 89 min; USA: 93 min

DVD Features
 Deleted scenes
 Making of featurette
 US theatrical trailer

The extras on the DVD reveal that the director prefers less professional actors and ambiguity. He was not at all trying to portray real life in the village; he was trying to tell a fantasy story about an alien.

Within the movie the recurring tropical theme seems to connect to Hawaii, but the repeated beach picture that comes alive at the end was actually filmed in Cuba; the director imagines that a sequel might be filmed there.

Filming locations for Nói Albinói:
 Bolungarvík, Iceland
 Cuba
 Reykjavík, Iceland
 Ísafjörður, Iceland
 Þingeyri, Iceland

Production company:
Zik zak filmworks

References

External links 
 
 
 
 

2003 films
Icelandic drama films
2000s Icelandic-language films
2000s French-language films
Films directed by Dagur Kári
Avalanches in film
2003 drama films
2003 multilingual films
Icelandic multilingual films